Vice Admiral Washington Shirley, 5th Earl Ferrers, FRS (26 May 1722 – 1 October 1778) was a British Royal Navy officer, peer, freemason and amateur astronomer.

Biography
Shirley was the second son of Hon. Laurence Shirley (himself the fourth son of Robert Shirley, 1st Earl Ferrers) and his wife, Anne. , he joined the Royal Navy and rose through the ranks as a Second Lieutenant in 1741, First Lieutenant in 1746 and Post-Captain soon after.

Two weeks after the execution of his brother, Laurence Shirley, 4th Earl Ferrers in 1760, Shirley took his seat in the House of Lords (as the new Earl Ferrers). Ferrers was appointed a deputy lieutenant of Staffordshire on 28 August 1761. In 1763, George III granted him the family estates, previously forfeit by his brother as a felon (much to the surprise of Casanova, then visiting London) and he began to transform the family seat of Staunton Harold in Leicestershire. He was later promoted as a Rear Admiral in 1771 and Vice-Admiral in 1775.

Due to persistent financial problems, he sold the estates of Astwell (including Astwell Castle) and Falcutt to Lord Temple between 1774 and 1777.

Ferrers was keen on astronomy and owned his own orrery. In 1761, Ferrers had been elected to the Royal Society for his work on the observations of the transit of Venus. Ferrers purchased Joseph Wright of Derby's painting entitled "A Philosopher giving a Lecture on the Orrery in which a lamp is put in place of the Sun" and he has been credited as being the figure on the right. Ferrers had Peter Perez Burdett (the figure on the left) as a house guest and he had attended a talk by James Ferguson who had given lectures on the orrery.

Shirley died, aged 56, in 1778 at Chartley Manor Place, Staffordshire and was buried at Staunton Harold. As he had no children by his wife, Anne, his title and estates passed to his younger brother, Robert.

References

1722 births
1778 deaths
18th-century British astronomers
Deputy Lieutenants of Staffordshire
05
Fellows of the Royal Society
Articles containing image maps
Royal Navy vice admirals
People associated with Derby Museum and Art Gallery
Grand Masters of the Premier Grand Lodge of England
Freemasons of the Premier Grand Lodge of England